Zephyranthes blumenavia is a plant species in the family Amaryllidaceae, endemic to southern Brazil. It occurs in the states of Paraná, Santa Catarina, and São Paulo.

References

blumenavia
Endemic flora of Brazil
Taxa named by Élie-Abel Carrière